A glycine receptor agonist is a drug which acts as an agonist of the glycine receptor.

Examples

Agonists
 β-Alanine
 D-Alanine
 D-Serine
 Glycine
 Hypotaurine
 L-Alanine
 L-Proline
 L-Serine
 Milacemide
 Quisqualamine
 Sarcosine
 Taurine
 Hypotaurine

PAMs
 Ethanol

See also
 Glycine receptor antagonist

References

Drugs acting on the nervous system